Sabash Ramudu is a 1959 Indian Telugu-language drama film directed by C. S. Rao. It stars N. T. Rama Rao and Devika, with music composed by Ghantasala. Te film was produced by Sundarlal Nahata, T. Aswathanarayana under the Rajshree Productions banner. The film is a remake of the Hindi film Bada Bhai (1957). It was dubbed in Tamil language with the title Sabash Ramu.

Plot 

Ramu leaves his village after he lost his property in a devastating flood. He finds a job as a rickshaw puller in Hyderabad. He settles down there with his wife Lakshmi, child Radha and his younger brother Mohan, who is a college student. Mareesu is a pickpocket and Mallika is a petty shop owner. Mareesu falls in love with Mallika. Bhupathi is the leader of the robber gang. He also runs a nightclub where Jayasri performs dances. She helps Bhupathy in his robberies. Ramu learns of the robber gang's hideout. An associate of Bhupathy shoots Ramu in the leg. Mohan is in love with Rani, who is the daughter of Police Commissioner Narayana Rao. He approves of their marriage and also gets a job for Mohan as a Police Inspector. However, Narayana Rao's son Kumar, who is also a Police Inspector does not like this. He is attracted to Jayasri and falls into bad company with Bhupathy. Bhupathi kills Jayasri and implicates Ramu in the murder. He also kidnaps Mallika, Mareesu, Kumar, Mohan, and Rani and holds them captive. Ramu escapes his custody. He informs the police and all are rescued by the police. Mohan and Rani marry.

Cast 
The list was adapted from the film's review article in The Hindu.

Male cast
N. T. Rama Rao as Ramu
Relangi as Mareesu
Ramana Murthy as Mohan
Kantha Rao as Kumar
Gummadi as Narayana Rao
R. Nageswara Rao as Bhupathi
K. V. S. Sarma as Bhupathi's associate

Female cast
Devika as Lakshmi
Malini as Rani
Girija as Mallika
M.N. Rajam as Jayasri
Baby Sasikala as Radha
Surabhi Kamalabai as servant maid

Production 
The story was based on a Hindi film Bada Bhai produced and directed by K. Amarnath and released in 1957. Sundarlal Nahata and T. Aswathanarayana, owners of Rajshri Productions bought the rights to remake the film in Telugu. Alterations were made in the story to appeal to the regional audiences. C. S. Rao directed the film while Sadasivabrahmam wrote the story and Telugu dialogues.

Soundtrack 
Music was composed by Ghantasala. The song "Jayammu Nischayammura" is inspired by the song "Kadam Badhaye Ja Nazar" from the 1957 film Bada Bhai, sung by Mohammed Rafi.

Telugu
Lyrics were penned by Kosaraju, Sri Sri and Sadasivabrahmam.

Tamil
Ku. Sa. Krishnamoorthi wrote the lyrics.

Release 
Sabash Ramudu was released on 4 September 1959. Its Tamil-dubbed version Sabash Ramu was released on 10 September.

References

External links 

1959 drama films
1959 films
Films scored by Ghantasala (musician)
Indian black-and-white films
Indian drama films
Telugu remakes of Hindi films
Films directed by C. S. Rao